Ryan Harrison was the defending champion, but elected not to defend his title.
Teenager Taylor Fritz won his third ATP Challenger Tour title, beating top seed Dudi Sela 7–6(9–7), 6–2

Seeds

Draw

Finals

Top half

Bottom half

References
 Main Draw
 Qualifying Draw

City of Onkaparinga ATP Challenger - Singles
2016 Singles
2016 in Australian tennis